The Bartym is a river in Perm Krai, Russia, a left tributary of the Shakva, which in turn is a tributary of the Sylva.

References 

Rivers of Perm Krai